Air Vice-Marshal D'Arcy Power  (2 June 1889 – 26 December 1958) was a British surgeon and Royal Air Force officer. He was the son of Sir D'Arcy Power, also a surgeon.

Army service
Power followed his father into part-time service in the RAMC in 1911, and during the First World War became a captain and won the Military Cross.

Royal Air Force service
He transferred to the Medical Branch of the Royal Air Force on the formation of the new service on 1 April 1918—taking a permanent commission as a flight lieutenant in 1920—and ultimately reaching the rank of acting air vice marshal by 1945 when he was appointed Commander of the Order of the British Empire.

Personal life
Power was a Freemason, and served as Master of the Lodge of Assistance No 2773 (London) from 1949 to 1950.

References 

1889 births
1958 deaths
Royal Air Force officers
Commanders of the Order of the British Empire
Recipients of the Military Cross
Freemasons of the United Grand Lodge of England